Hillary Clinton, a Democrat, served as the 67th United States Secretary of State (2009–2013), United States Senator from New York (2001–2009), and First Lady of the United States (1993–2001). She was also a candidate in the 2008 and 2016 Democratic presidential primaries. In 2016, Clinton was her party's presidential candidate but lost the election to her Republican opponent, Donald Trump.

1978 and 1980 Legal Services Corporation nominations

United States Senate confirmations to the Legal Services Corporation:

1978
Confirmed for a two-year term, expiring in 1980.

1980
Confirmed for a three-year term, expiring in 1983.

2000 New York United States Senate election

2006 New York United States Senate election

2008 United States presidential election

2008 Democratic Party primary elections

Cumulative primary and caucus votes, excluding penalized contests:
 Barack Obama - 16,706,853 (49.03%)
 Hillary Rodham Clinton - 16,239,821 (47.66%)
 John Edwards* - 742,010 (2.17%)
 Bill Richardson* - 89,054 (0.26%)
 Uncommitted - 82,660 (0.24%)
 Dennis Kucinich* - 68,482 (0.2%)
 Joe Biden* - 64,041 (0.18%)
 Mike Gravel* - 27,662 (0.08%)
 Christopher Dodd* - 25,300 (0.07%)
 Others - 22,556 (0.06%)

Cumulative primary and caucus votes, including penalized contests:
 Hillary Rodham Clinton - 18,225,175 (48.03%)
 Barack Obama - 17,988,182 (47.41%)
 John Edwards* - 1,006,275 (2.65%)
 Uncommitted - 299,610 (0.79%)
 Bill Richardson* - 106,073 (0.28%)
 Dennis Kucinich* - 103,994 (0.27%)
 Joe Biden* - 81,641 (0.22%)
 Scattering - 44,348 (0.12%)
 Mike Gravel* - 40,251 (0.11%)
 Christopher Dodd* - 35,281 (0.09%)
(* denotes dropped out from race before end of caucuses and primaries)

2008 Democratic Party delegate count

2009 United States Secretary of State nomination

2016 United States presidential election

2016 Democratic Party primary elections

2016 Democratic Party delegate count

2016 U.S. presidential election

See also

 Electoral history of Bill Clinton
 Electoral history of Barack Obama
 Electoral history of Joe Biden
 Electoral history of Kamala Harris
 Electoral history of Bernie Sanders

References

Hillary Clinton
Clinton, Hillary Rodham
Clinton, Hillary Rodham